Zarudny's worm lizard (Diplometopon zarudnyi) is a species of amphisbaenian reptile in the family Trogonophidae. The species is monotypic within the genus Diplometopon. The species is native to the Middle East.

Etymology
The specific name, zarudnyi, is in honor of Russian zoologist Nikolai Zarudny.

Geographic range
D. zarudnyi is found in western Iran, southern Iraq, and on the Arabian peninsula in Kuwait, Oman, Qatar, northern Saudi Arabia, and the United Arab Emirates.

Habitat

Description
Because it has no limbs, it uses body undulations similar to a snake to move itself along. It has limited vision.

Behavior
D. zarudnyi is terrestrial and fossorial, burrowing in sand or loose soil.

Diet
The diet of D. zarudnyi consists of insects (mainly larvae and adults of beetles of the genus Dermestes), and other small invertebrates.

Reproduction
D. zarudnyi is oviparous.

Conservation status
D. zarudnyi is classified as Least Concern (LC) in the IUCN Red List.

References

Further reading
Haas G (1957). "Some Amphibians and Reptiles from Arabia". Proceedings of the California Academy of Sciences, Fourth Series 29 (3): 47–86. (Diplometopon zarudnyi, pp. 71–72, Figure 8). 
Nikolsky AM (1907). "[Reptiles and Amphibians Collected by N. A. Zarudny in Persia in 1903–1904]". Annuaire du Musée Zoologique de l'Académie Impériale des Sciences de St.-Pétersbourg 10 (3–4): 260–301. (Diplometopon, new genus, pp.  276–277; D. zarudnyi, new species, pp. 277–280, figures 1–3). (in Latin and Russian).
Rudayni HA, Al-Sadoon MK, Paray BA (2017). "Morphological characteristics of worm lizard, Diplometopon zarudnyi (Squamata: Trogonophidae), in the central region of Saudi Arabia". Saudi Journal of Biological Sciences 24 (4): 966–971.
Sindaco R, Jeremčenko VK (2008). Reptiles of the Western Palearctic. 1. Annotated Checklist and Distributional Atlas of the Turtles, Crocodiles, Amphisbaenians and Lizards of Europe, North Africa, Middle East and Central Asia. (Monographs of the Societas Herpetologica Italica). Latina, Italy: Edizioni Belvedere. 580 pp. .

Trogonophidae
Reptiles of the Arabian Peninsula
Reptiles of Iran
Reptiles of Iraq
Reptiles described in 1907
Taxa named by Alexander Nikolsky